James Allodi (born February 26, 1967) is a Canadian actor, writer and director.

Career
James Allodi earned a Bachelor of Fine Arts, with a Major in Film, from New York University. Since then, the writer, director, and actor has amassed an impressive resume of stage, television and film credits. His first feature film was the critically acclaimed, off-beat comedy The Uncles. Television directing credits include Naked Josh (which won him a Gemini Award for best direction), Rent-A-Goalie, Paradise Falls, Degrassi, and The Associates.

As an actor, he starred in Daniel MacIvor's Wilby Wonderful, Paul Gross' Men With Brooms and Peter Lynch's Genie Award nominated feature-length documentary The Herd.

Allodi had a recurring role in the television series Once A Thief, and has appeared in numerous other series including The Associates, The Newsroom, and Due South.

Filmography

 Kung Fu: The Legend Continues (1995)
 Due South (1994, 1996)
 Once a Thief (1998)
 PSI Factor: Chronicles of the Paranormal (1997, 1999)
 The Herd (1998)
 Elimination Dance (1998)
 American Whiskey Bar (1998)
 When Ponds Freeze Over (1998)
 The Five Senses (1999)
 Top of the Food Chain (1999)
 Thrill Seekers (1999) - FBI Agent Stanton
 The Uncles (2000)
 The Associates (2001)
 Men with Brooms (2002)
 Wilby Wonderful (2004)
 Snow Cake (2006)
 Naked Josh (2006)
 ReGenesis (2007)

References

External links 

1967 births
Living people
Canadian male television actors
Male actors from Toronto
Canadian male film actors
Canadian Film Centre alumni